Manjalpur is a major area in Vadodara city of the Gujarat state in India. The area code is 390011.
 
Manjalpur is an industrial area with lower as well as higher middle class of Vadodara.

Manjalpur has Hospitals in the recent times like Medistar and Spandan. Manjalpur is housed by most of the businessmen of the city as it is next to Gujarat Industrial and Development corporation (G.I.D.C). 

Manjalpur  flyover near Lalbaug is one of the biggest flyover in Vadodara connected from Manjalpur to Raj Mahal road and from Pratap Nagar to Viswamitri bridge. 

Manjalpur has schools like Shreyas Vidyalaya, Vidyakunj High School, Bharatiya Vidya Bhavan (AKA Bhavans) High School, Baroda High School (ONGC), Kendriya Vidyalaya, Little Flowers School, Mahatma Gandhi High School, Panchsheel High School etc. Famous spots in this area are Saraswati Complex, Silver Coin, Indra Complex, Darbar Chokdi, Manjalpur Naka, Deep Chambers, Tulsidhaam Chokdi and Vrajdham Mandir.  From this area a daily newspaper called Vadnagari in Gujarati is published.

The area is connected by many circles like Darbar chowkdi, Sai Chowkdi, Pramukh Prasad Chowkdi and Many other chowkdis. There is a mall called Eva Mall. Manjalpur is one of the largest areas and have the largest population of Vadodara city. It neighbour areas are Makarpura, Atladara, Vadsar, Lalbaugh. The area is under-developed, gradually turning into a developed area.
 

Urban and suburban areas of Vadodara